NWA Powerrr is a professional wrestling streaming television program produced by the National Wrestling Alliance (NWA) that premiered on October 8, 2019. The series currently streams on FITE TV, where episodes are also made available on-demand, and the NWA's YouTube channel.  Powerrr features wrestlers performing in matches and getting interviewed. These elements together create and further the storylines of the NWA while building towards the promotion's pay-per-view events.

History

On May 1, 2017, Billy Corgan bought the National Wrestling Alliance, including its name, rights, trademarks and championship belts. Full ownership took effect on October 1, 2017. Corgan, Vice President Dave Lagana, and their production team would rebuild the NWA brand, acknowledging its history from its original inception in 1948, while gradually transitioning into a singular entity.

In September 2019, NWA announced tapings for a weekly television show, later revealed to be titled NWA Powerrr. The first tapings were held on September 30 and October 1 at the GPB Studios in Atlanta, Georgia, which has since been dubbed the "NWA Arena." The series would debut on October 8, 2019 on the NWA's YouTube channel. The program's air time, 6:05 PM, is a call back to the classic World Championship Wrestling show by former NWA member Jim Crockett Promotions that would air at 6:05 PM on Saturdays from the early 1970s until 1992.  WOAI-TV San Antonio news reporter Joe Galli and longtime pro-wrestling manager/executive Jim Cornette were the initial commentators. Championship Wrestling from Hollywood owner David Marquez serves as an interviewer and ring announcer. Kyle Durden serves as backstage interviewer.

Following the November 19 episode of NWA Powerrr being listed, it was quickly taken down due to remarks by Cornette which some deemed racist. NWA released a statement the next day stating that Cornette resigned. He was subsequently replaced by Stu Bennett who joined Galli on commentary beginning with NWA's December 14 pay-per-view, Into the Fire.

In March 2021, after the NWA went on a hiatus due to the COVID-19 pandemic, television tapings for Powerrr would resume as part of a new distribution agreement with FITE TV. On Tuesday, April 13, the NWA debuted a companion series titled Powerrr Surge, which features additional wrestler interviews, unseen matches, and recaps from the previous Powerrr episodes.

On January 5, 2022, the NWA announced that Power would return to YouTube, airing on Fridays after the Tuesday premiere on FITE.

Episodes

Each season of Powerrr focuses on storylines leading into the NWA's pay-per-view events. The third season was to culminate with the Crockett Cup, but the event was cancelled due to the 2020 COVID-19 pandemic.

On-air personalities

In addition to the wrestlers (male and female), managers/valets, and referees, the show features various on-air personalities including authority figures, commentators, ring announcers, and backstage interviewers.

Authority figures

Commentators

Ring announcers

Backstage interviewers

See also

NWA USA
List of professional wrestling television series

References

External links
 

 Official NWA YouTube channel

2019 American television series debuts
2020s American television series
National Wrestling Alliance shows
American professional wrestling television series
American non-fiction web series
English-language television shows
Facebook
YouTube original programming